Alan Goodrich Kirk (October 30, 1888 – October 15, 1963) was a United States Navy admiral during World War II and diplomat.

Biography
He graduated from the United States Naval Academy in 1909 and served in the United States Navy during World War I and World War II. During his wartime naval service, Alan Kirk became the U.S. naval attaché in London (1939 to 1941). He was Director of the Office of Naval Intelligence from March 1941 but, obstructed and opposed by Rear Admiral Richmond Turner, he was unable to develop the office into an effective centre along the lines of the British Royal Naval Operational Intelligence Centre (which he had seen whilst in London). Eventually, he requested a transfer to an Atlantic destroyer squadron.

Kirk served as an amphibious commander in the Mediterranean in 1942 and 1943 (the Allied invasion of Sicily and Italy). In addition, he was the senior U.S. naval commander during the Normandy landings of June 6, 1944, embarked on the heavy cruiser , and as Commander U.S. Naval Forces, France during 1944 and 1945. He retired from the Navy as a full admiral in 1946. He was decorated with Legion of Honour by the Provisional Government of the French Republic for his World War II service.

After retirement from the United States Navy, Kirk embarked on a diplomatic career, and subsequently served in several United States embassies abroad, beginning with the combined posting of U.S. Ambassador to Belgium/U.S. Envoy to Luxembourg (resident in Brussels, Belgium), 1946–49; as U.S. Ambassador to the Soviet Union, July 4, 1949, to October 6, 1951; and finally as United States Ambassador to Taiwan, June 7, 1962, to January 16, 1963. He served as ambassador to the Soviet Union during the beginning of the Korean War, and expressed concern that the conflict could escalate to World War III, comparing it to proxy conflicts of the 1930s such as the Spanish Civil War and the Soviet–Japanese border conflicts which he believed precipitated World War II. 

Admiral Kirk took his post as the second president of Amcomlib, in February 1952. As a former U.S. ambassador to the Soviet Union, he oversaw the recruitment of emigres in New York City and Munich, a group that would later form the core of Radio Liberty's staff. Less than a year after taking office, Kirk was forced to resign due to poor health. Also in 1952, he served briefly as Director of the Psychological Strategy Board, which planned for and coordinated government psychological operations.

He was portrayed onscreen in the epic dramatization of D-Day by the Australian actor John Meillon.

See also

 Perle Mesta

References

Further reading
 Kohnen, David. Alan Goodrich Kirk: U.S. Navy Admiral of Intelligence and Diplomacy. In: John Hattendorf and Bruce Elleman (Eds.). Nineteen Gun Salute: Profiles in U.S. Navy Leadership in Wartime Operations. Newport, Rhode Island: Naval War College Press, 2010, pp. 75–92.
 Kirk, Lydia. Postmarked Moscow.

External links
 
 

1888 births
1963 deaths
United States Navy admirals
Ambassadors of the United States to Taiwan
United States Navy personnel of World War I
United States Navy World War II admirals
Recipients of the Navy Distinguished Service Medal
Recipients of the Legion of Merit
Burials at Arlington National Cemetery
Ambassadors of the United States to the Soviet Union
20th-century American diplomats
Honorary Knights Grand Cross of the Order of the Bath
Ambassadors of the United States to Belgium
Directors of the Office of Naval Intelligence
Military personnel from Philadelphia
United States naval attachés